Radek Číp (born June 17, 1992) is a Czech professional ice hockey forward. He currently plays for Odense Bulldogs 

Číp made his Czech Extraliga debut playing with HC Pardubice during the 2013–14 Czech Extraliga season. At the conclusion of the season, Cip left Pardubice as a free agent and signed an optional two-year contract with Czech club, Orli Znojmo, who compete in the Austrian EBEL on May 29, 2014.

References

External links

1992 births
Living people
Czech ice hockey forwards
Orli Znojmo players
HC Dynamo Pardubice players
Frederikshavn White Hawks players
Odense Bulldogs players
Dornbirn Bulldogs players
HC ZUBR Přerov players
BK Havlíčkův Brod players
VHK Vsetín players
Czech expatriate ice hockey people
Czech expatriate sportspeople in Austria
Czech expatriate sportspeople in Denmark
Expatriate ice hockey players in Austria
Expatriate ice hockey players in Denmark